Somatidia pictipes is a species of beetle in the family Cerambycidae. It was described by Broun in 1880.

References

pictipes
Beetles described in 1880